Eocypselus is an genus of prehistoric birds believed to be ancestral to modern hummingbirds and swifts.

Species
Eocypselus rowei Ksepka et al., 2013
Eocypselus vincenti Harrison, 1984

References

Apodiformes
Prehistoric bird genera